Ribosomal protein S4, Y-linked 2 also known as RPS4Y2 is a protein which in humans is encoded by the RPS4Y2 gene which resides on the Y chromosome.

Function
Cytoplasmic ribosomes, organelles that catalyze protein synthesis, consist of a small 40S subunit and a large 60S subunit. Together these subunits are composed of 4 RNA species and approximately 80 structurally distinct proteins. This gene encodes ribosomal protein S4, a component of the 40S subunit. Ribosomal protein S4 is the only ribosomal protein known to be encoded by more than one gene, namely this gene, RPS4Y1 and the ribosomal protein S4, X-linked (RPS4X). The 3 isoforms encoded by these genes are not identical, but appear to be functionally equivalent. Ribosomal protein S4 belongs to the S4E family of ribosomal proteins. It has been suggested that haploinsufficiency of the ribosomal protein S4 genes plays a role in Turner syndrome; however, this hypothesis is controversial.

References

Ribosomal proteins